Cemetery Junction is a road junction in East Reading, bordering on Newtown, in the town of Reading in the English county of Berkshire. It is a notorious bottleneck for traffic during rush hour, with the main A4 road meeting the A329 road from Wokingham.

The junction is named after Reading Old Cemetery just to the east, with a grand ornamental gatehouse immediately off the junction.

Facilities
Located in the Cemetery Junction is Wycliffe Baptist Church, Arthur Hill Swimming Pool (closed in 2016), food shops, takeaway food outlets, public houses and a pharmacy.

Eponymous film

Cemetery Junction is the title of a 2010 film, directed by Stephen Merchant and Ricky Gervais, which was released in the UK on 14 April 2010 and which tackles love and class in a small 1970s town. Gervais explained that the title of the film was taken from Cemetery Junction, Reading, an area he knew as a child. Gervais also adds "[...] it's not really set in Reading, it's any small town, anywhere in the world to be honest."

Transport
Several major bus routes serve the Cemetery Junction, including:
 Reading Buses route 17, Tilehurst–Three Tuns (Earley)
 Reading Buses routes 13 and 14, Reading–Woodley
 Reading Buses route 4 and X4, Reading–Wokingham–Bracknell
 Arriva route 850, Reading–High Wycombe
 Thames Travel routes 126,127,128,129 Twyford-Wokingham

References

Geography of Reading, Berkshire
Road junctions in England
Transport in Reading, Berkshire
A4 road (England)